Ploketta was a town of ancient Bithynia. Its name does not occur in ancient writers but is inferred from epigraphic and other evidence.

Its site is located near Orta Pinarlar, in Asiatic Turkey.

References

Populated places in Bithynia
Former populated places in Turkey
History of Bursa Province